The Rautia is a caste found in the states of Jharkhand, Chhatishgarh and Odisha in India. They were agriculturalist, estate holder and militia under Nagvanshi kings of Chotanagpur.

History and origin 
According to their traditions, the community helped and protect  Rajput prince, who as a reward had given lands in Lohardaga, Jashpur territory. They were agriculturalist, estate holder and militia under the Nagvanshi kings of Chotanagpur.

In 1812 Jagirdar Bakhtar Say along with Parganait Mundal Singh rebelled against excessive tax imposition. They killed tax collector send by Nagvanshi king Govind Nath Shah and defeated an East India Company force. Later they were defeated by company force, captured and hanged in Kolkata.

Subdivision
Rautia have three subdivision Barki, Majhli, Chhotki. The subdivision is based on purity of descent. Barki are of pure descent. Majhli and Chhotki subdivision are descendants of Rautia father and mother of other castes. Offspring were admitted to Majhli group if mother was from Kanwar, Gond and other respectable caste. Offsprings of Rautia father and  women from untouchable caste such as Ganda and Ghasia caste were admitted to Chhotki group.

Present circumstances
They speak the Sadri dialect of Hindi. They have titles like Ganjhu, Baraik, Kotwar, Sai  and Singh.
The Rautia are divided into three sub-groups, the Bargohri or pure Rautia,  the Majhgohri and chhot gohri. This is also divided into gotras (subdivision): Barwan (wild dog), Baghel (tiger), Bira (hawk), Jogi, Kansi (Kans grass), Katwar, Kharakwar, Kharsyal (deer), Khumbhoj, Kumhar (potter), Lathoor,  Majhi, Nag (Cobra), Rukhi (Squirrel), Sand (bull), Sonwani (gold water) etc. Marriage is forbidden within same clan and allowed within different clans. These groups are endogamous, with the former considering itself superior over the other.  It is said that the Majhli and Chhotki were the descendants of Rautia fathers and mothers of other castes. Traditionally and primarily they are cultivators. They also gather fruits and tubers from the jungles nearby. A small number have begun to emigrate to towns and cities such as Ranchi.

Culture
The traditional festivals of Rautia are Karam, Jitiya, Nawakhani and Diwali. The traditional dances of Rautia are Jhumar , Domkach and Paiki.

Official classification
Rautia are included in list of Other Backward Class in Jharkhand, Chhattisgarh and Odisha.

In 2016, The  Dr Ram Dayal Munda Tribal Research Institute recommend  inclusion of Rautia caste in Schedule Tribe list. According to TRI, Rautia have primitive features, distinctive culture and are backward in social, educational and economical aspects. The Government of Jharkhand had sent the proposal to the Ministry of Tribal Affairs, Government of India. But the proposal have not approved yet by Government of India.

References

Social groups of Bihar
Social groups of Madhya Pradesh
Indian castes
Social groups of Jharkhand
Social groups of Odisha